A relational database management system uses SQL  (also called upsert) statements to INSERT new records or UPDATE existing records depending on whether condition matches.  It was officially introduced in the SQL:2003 standard, and expanded in the SQL:2008 standard.

Usage
MERGE INTO tablename USING table_reference ON (condition)
  WHEN MATCHED THEN
    UPDATE SET column1 = value1 [, column2 = value2 ...]
  WHEN NOT MATCHED THEN
    INSERT (column1 [, column2 ...]) VALUES (value1 [, value2 ...]);

A right join is employed over the Target (the INTO table) and the Source (the USING table / view / sub-query)--where Target is the left table and Source is the right one. The four possible combinations yield these rules:
 If the ON field(s) in the Source matches the ON field(s) in the Target, then UPDATE
 If the ON field(s) in the Source does not match the ON field(s) in the Target, then INSERT
 If the ON field(s) does not exist in the Source but does exist in the Target, then no action is performed.
 If the ON field(s) does not exist in either the Source or Target, then no action is performed.
 
If multiple Source rows match a given Target row, an error is mandated by SQL:2003 standards. You cannot update a Target row multiple times with a MERGE statement

Implementations
Database management systems PostgreSQL, Oracle Database, IBM Db2, Teradata, EXASOL, Firebird, CUBRID, H2, HSQLDB, MS SQL, Vectorwise and Apache Derby support the standard syntax. Some also add non-standard SQL extensions.

Synonymous
Some database implementations adopted the term "Upsert" (a portmanteau of update and insert) to a database statement, or combination of statements, that inserts a record to a table in a database if the record does not exist or, if the record already exists, updates the existing record. This synonym is used in PostgreSQL (v9.5+) and SQLite (v3.24+). It is also used to abbreviate the "MERGE" equivalent pseudo-code.

It is used in Microsoft Azure SQL Database.

Other non-standard implementations
Some other database management systems support this, or very similar behavior, through their own, non-standard SQL extensions.

MySQL, for example, supports the use of  syntax which can be used to achieve a similar effect with the limitation that the join between target and source has to be made only on PRIMARY KEY or UNIQUE constraints, which is not required in the ANSI/ISO standard. It also supports  syntax, which first attempts an insert, and if that fails, deletes the row, if exists, and then inserts the new one. There is also an  clause for the  statement, which tells the server to ignore "duplicate key" errors and go on (existing rows will not be inserted or updated, but all new rows will be inserted).

SQLite's  works similarly.  It also supports  as an alias for compatibility with MySQL.

Firebird supports  though fails to throw an error when there are multiple Source data rows. Additionally there is a single-row version, but the latter does not give you the option to take different actions on insert versus update (e.g. setting a new sequence value only for new rows, not for existing ones.)

IBM Db2 extends the syntax with multiple  and  clauses, distinguishing them with  guards.

Microsoft SQL Server extends with supporting guards and also with supporting Left Join via  clauses.

PostgreSQL supports merge since version 15 but previously supported merging via .

CUBRID supports  statement. And supports the use of  syntax. It also supports  for compatibility with MySQL.

Apache Phoenix supports  and UPSERT SELECT syntax.

Spark SQL supports  and  clauses in actions.

Apache Impala supports .

Usage in NoSQL
A similar concept is applied in some NoSQL databases.

E.g. in MongoDB the fields in a value associated with a key can be updated with an  operation. The  raises an error if the key is not found.
In the  operation it is possible to set the  flag: in this case a new value is stored associated to the given key if it does not exist, otherwise the whole value is replaced.

In Redis the  operations sets the value associated with a given key. Redis does not know any detail of the internal structure of the value, so an update would have no meaning. So the  operation has always a set or replace semantics.

See also
 Join in particular:
 Join (SQL)
 join (Unix)

References

External links
 Oracle 11g Release 2 documentation on 
 Firebird 2.1 documentation on 
 DB2 v9 MERGE statement
 Microsoft SQL Server documentation
 HSQLdb 2.0 Data Change Statements
 H2 (1.2) SQL Syntax page

SQL keywords
Articles with example SQL code